Global Wars 2017 was a professional wrestling tour co-produced by the American Ring of Honor (ROH) and Japanese New Japan Pro-Wrestling (NJPW) promotions. The tour's four events took place on October 12 at Buffalo RiverWorks in Buffalo, New York, October 13 at Stage AE in Pittsburgh, Pennsylvania, October 14 at Express Live! in Columbus, Ohio, and October 15 at Odeum Expo Center in Villa Park, Illinois. This was the fourth year in which ROH and NJPW co-produced shows under the Global Wars name.

Production

Background
In 2014, the American Ring of Honor (ROH) and Japanese New Japan Pro-Wrestling (NJPW) announced a partnership as part of which they held the first Global Wars show on May 10, 2014, in Toronto, Ontario, Canada. Global Wars, along with War of the Worlds, became an annual tradition. In 2015, the promotions held two Global Wars shows, both in Toronto. In 2016, Global Wars was held as a one-night pay-per-view (PPV) in Chicago Ridge, Illinois. While all the previous Global Wars had taken place in May, in 2017, the event was moved to October and turned into a tour. Originally it was announced on July 14 as a three-show tour, taking place in Buffalo, New York; Pittsburgh, Pennsylvania and Columbus, Ohio, before a fourth show in Villa Park, Illinois was added on July 31.

The first batch of wrestlers announced for the tour included Hiromu Takahashi, Killer Elite Squad (Davey Boy Smith Jr. and Lance Archer), Kushida and Yoshi-Hashi from NJPW and The Briscoes (Jay Briscoe and Mark Briscoe), Bully Ray, Cody, Dalton Castle and the Boys, Jay Lethal and The Young Bucks (Matt Jackson and Nick Jackson) from ROH. On July 31, ROH added NJPW wrestler Kenny Omega to the tour's final event in Villa Park, Illinois. Originally, the promotion announced that Omega would be defending the IWGP United States Heavyweight Championship at the show, but later retracted the title match announcement. The Omega announcement led to the final show becoming the fastest selling event in ROH history with 1,875 tickets being sold the first day. On September 22, ROH announced that Omega would work all four of the Global Wars events. Three days later, ROH again announced that Omega would defend the IWGP United States Heavyweight Championship on October 15. On September 29, ROH announced that Minoru Suzuki would take part in all four shows of the tour, which was followed by similar announcements for Will Ospreay and Toru Yano the following day. On October 2, ROH announced that the final night of the tour would air live on internet pay-per-view (iPPV). In addition, the second and third night of the tour would be available on free live streams for all members of ROH's Ringside service.

Storylines
The Global Wars 2017 shows featured professional wrestling matches that involved different wrestlers from pre-existing scripted feuds and storylines. Wrestlers portrayed villains, heroes, or less distinguishable characters in the scripted events that built tension and culminated in a wrestling match or series of matches.

On September 26, 2017, ROH announced the first match for the tour, which would see Kenny Omega defend the IWGP United States Heavyweight Championship against Yoshi-Hashi on October 15. The match was set up on September 24 at NJPW's Destruction in Kobe show, where Yoshi-Hashi challenged Omega after he had successfully defended his title against Juice Robinson. Omega initially dismissed the challenge, but then accepted it, considering Yoshi-Hashi "great warm up". The history between the two dated back to 2016, when Yoshi-Hashi defeated Omega during the 2016 G1 Climax. The two later had a rematch, where Omega successfully defended the Tokyo Dome IWGP Heavyweight Championship challenge rights certificate against Yoshi-Hashi. This match would mark the first time the IWGP United States Heavyweight Championship would be defended in the United States.

Results

Global Wars: Buffalo

Global Wars: Pittsburgh

Global Wars: Columbus

Global Wars: Chicago

See also
2017 in professional wrestling

References

External links
Official New Japan Pro-Wrestling website 
Official Ring of Honor website

2017 in professional wrestling
2017
Events in Pittsburgh
Events in Villa Park, Illinois
Events in Buffalo, New York
Events in Columbus, Ohio
Professional wrestling in Illinois
Professional wrestling in Pittsburgh
October 2017 events in the United States
Professional wrestling in Buffalo, New York
Professional wrestling in Columbus, Ohio
2017 Ring of Honor pay-per-view events